Heil is a census-designated place and unincorporated community in Grant County, North Dakota, United States. Its population was 15 as of the 2010 census. Heil was initially named "Lawther" for founder William Lawther; after William Heil bought the community from Lawther, it was renamed to "Heil".

Demographics

References

Census-designated places in Grant County, North Dakota
Census-designated places in North Dakota
Unincorporated communities in North Dakota
Unincorporated communities in Grant County, North Dakota